Abdul Halim Iskandar (born 14 July 1962), often nicknamed Gus Halim, is an Indonesian politician who is the 7th and current Minister of Villages, Development of Disadvantaged Regions, and Transmigration in President Joko Widodo's Onward Indonesia Cabinet since 2019. A member of the National Awakening Party (PKB), he previously served as the speaker of the East Java Regional People's Representative Council from 2014 to 2019. He is married to Lilik Umi Nasriiyah, the couple has 3 children.

References 

Living people
1962 births
Place of birth missing (living people)
21st-century Indonesian politicians
Onward Indonesia Cabinet
National Awakening Party politicians
Yogyakarta State University alumni